A special election was held for Rizal's 1st district seat to the House of Representatives of the Philippines on March 7, 1994. Gilberto Duavit Sr. won the special election to serve the final 14 months of former representative Manuel Sanchez's term.

Background
Incumbent representative Manuel Sanchez was removed from office after the House of Representatives Electoral Tribunal ruled that he is an American citizen. A special election was then called, scheduled for March 7, 1994. Six candidates participated including Rogelio Sanchez Silvestre, Sanchez's nephew, former House majority leader Francisco Sumulong, former assemblyman Gilberto Duavit Sr. of the opposition Nationalist People's Coalition (NPC), and three independent candidates: chess grandmaster Rosendo Balinas Jr., lawyer Eduardo Inlayo and peasant leader Elmer Panotes.

Sumulong previously served as representative but gave up his seat to run unsuccessfully in the 1992 Senate election. Sumulong was supported by presidents Corazon Aquino and Fidel Ramos. Duavit was supported by Rizal governor Casimiro Ynares and vice president Joseph Estrada, while Silvestre was backed by former Senate President Jovito Salonga and other Liberal Party stalwarts.

Cainta and Taytay were expected to provide the swing votes as neither of the candidates are from those two municipalities, and that many residents there were immigrants from other parts of the country. Turnout was expected to be low as no holiday was declared on election day.

Result

Duavit won over former representative Francisco Sumulong by 21,034 votes. The low turnout of 37% was blamed on Rizal's traffic problems, and the inability of employees and students to cast their votes when they reside outside the district during the workweek/school week.

After his election victory, a member of the Duavit family has served as representative of Rizal's 1st district up to the current 19th Congress.

References

1994 elections in the Philippines
Special elections to the Congress of the Philippines
Elections in Rizal